Mianeh, Miana or Miyaneh city may refer to:

Places

Burkina Faso
Miana (Burkina), a village in Ouarkoye Department

Iran

 Mianeh, East Azerbaijan, a city in East Azerbaijan Province
 Mianeh (electoral district), a 5th electoral district in the East Azerbaijan Province
 Mianeh-ye Kord Ahmad, a village in East Azerbaijan Province
 Mianeh County (Iran), in East Azerbaijan Province
 Mianeh, Fars
 Mianeh-ye Jenjan, Fars Province
 Miyaneh-ye Olya, Fars Province
 Miyaneh-ye Sofla, Fars Province
 Mianeh, Kermanshah
 Meyaneh, Kohgiluyeh and Boyer-Ahmad
 Mianeh, Kurdistan
 Meydaneh or Mīāneh, Kamyaran, Kurdistan
 Miana, Iran, Mazandaran Province
 Mianej, Qazvin or Mianeh

Turkmenistan
Miana, Turkmenistan

Other uses
Miana (genus), a former genus of moth

Miana (Pashtun tribe), a tribe who have their roots in modern-day Azerbaijan

See also